Siphesihle  is a given name. Notable people with the name include:
Siphesihle Mkhize (born 1999) is a South African soccer player 
Siphesihle Ndlovu (born 1996) is a South African professional soccer player
Siphesihle November (born 1998 or 1999) is a South African ballet dancer.
Siphesihle Ntuli is a South African field hockey coach.
Siphesihle Punguzwa (born 1993) is a South African rugby union player